The Wrangell Mountains are a high mountain range of eastern Alaska in the United States.  Much of the range is included in Wrangell-Saint Elias National Park and Preserve. The Wrangell Mountains are almost entirely volcanic in origin, and they include the second and third highest volcanoes in the United States, Mount Blackburn and Mount Sanford.  The range takes its name from Mount Wrangell, which is one of the largest andesite shield volcanoes in the world, and also the only presently active volcano in the range.  The Wrangell Mountains comprise most of the Wrangell Volcanic Field, which also extends into the neighboring Saint Elias Mountains and the Yukon Territory in Canada.

The Wrangell Mountains are just to the northwest of the Saint Elias Mountains and northeast of the Chugach Mountains, which are along the coast of the Gulf of Alaska. These ranges have the combined effect of blocking the inland areas from warmer moist air over the Pacific Ocean. The inland areas to the north of the Wrangell Mountains are therefore among the coldest areas of North America during the winter.

Major peaks

Mount Blackburn, and East Summit, 
Mount Sanford, and South Peak, 
Mount Wrangell, and West Summit, 
Atna Peaks, 
Regal Mountain, 
Mount Jarvis, and North Peak, 
Parka Peak, 
Mount Zanetti, 

Other prominent mountains include:
Mount Drum, 
Castle Peak,

Name origin and references in popular culture
The mountains are named after explorer, president of Russian-American Company, and admiral Ferdinand von Wrangel. American folk singer John Denver wrote a song, "The Wrangell Mountain Song", in reference to the range.

See also

 Wrangellia Terrane

References

External links

 Wrangell-St. Elias National Park & Preserve
 Wrangell Mountains Center

Landforms of Copper River Census Area, Alaska
Mountain ranges of Alaska
Mountains of Unorganized Borough, Alaska